Betty Degner was an All-American Girls Professional Baseball League player.

Degner enjoyed little success in the league as she appeared in just two games in its 1949 season. She was signed as a pitcher and was added to the Muskegon Lassies roster, then was traded to the Springfield Sallies during the midseason.

She posted a batting average of .200 (1-for-5) but did not receive credit for a win or a loss.

The All-American Girls Professional Baseball League folded in 1954, but there is a permanent display at the Baseball Hall of Fame and Museum at Cooperstown, New York since November 5, 1988, that honors the entire league rather than any individual figure.

Sources

All-American Girls Professional Baseball League players
Muskegon Lassies players
Springfield Sallies players
Baseball players from Illinois
People from Amboy, Illinois
Date of birth missing
Possibly living people
Year of birth missing